Cârciumaru is a Romanian occupational surname literally meaning "innkeeper" (borrowed from the Slavic term корчма (korchma) for inn, tavern). Notable people with the surname include:

 (born 1931), Romanian politician, several times member of the Senate of Romania
 (born 1956), Romanian politician, former member of the Senate of Romania (2016-2020)

Romanian-language surnames
Occupational surnames